The Mitoc is a left tributary of the river Suceava in Romania. It flows into the Suceava in the city Suceava. Its lowermost course is shared with the river Dragomirna, another left tributary of the Suceava.

Gallery

References

Rivers of Romania
Rivers of Suceava County